Fernanda Constanza Hidalgo Rubilar (born 4 May 1998) is a Chilean footballer who plays as a midfielder for Colo-Colo and the Chile women's national team.

International career
Hidalgo made her senior debut for Chile on 1 September 2019 in a 0–0 friendly draw against Brazil (won by Chile through the penalty shoot-out).

References 

1998 births
Living people
Women's association football midfielders
Chilean women's footballers
Footballers from Santiago
Chile women's international footballers
Colo-Colo (women) footballers